Iron Cross is the name of two fictional characters appearing in American comic books published by Marvel Comics.

Publication history
The Helmut Gruler version of Iron Cross first appears in The Invaders #35 (Dec. 1978) and was created by Roy Thomas and Don Heck.

The Clare Gruler version of Iron Cross first appeared in All-New Invaders #9 (Aug. 2014) and was created by James Robinson and Steve Pugh.

Fictional character biography

Helmut Gruler

Helmut Gruler is a World War II German soldier that first appears in the title Invaders. Gruler volunteers to wear armor created by Professor Franz Schneider for use against the Allied forces. Using the alias "Iron Cross", the character creates havoc until apparently killed during a battle with superhero team the Invaders.

Iron Cross reappears in the modern Marvel universe in the title Midnight Sons Unlimited, having apparently been saved and sustained by his armor.

Iron Cross is revealed in the limited series to be a founding member of the modern version of the V-Battalion, a secret group dedicated to hunting down war criminals. Iron Cross apparently dies preventing the spread of nanotechnology throughout the world by terrorist organization HYDRA.

Clare Gruler
Clare Gruler is the daughter of Helmut Gruler who took on her father's legacy and became a hero in Germany.

As part of the All-New, All-Different Marvel event, Clare Gruler's Inhuman gene activated when she was inside the Iron Cross armor which caused her to have powers that molecular-bonded her to the Iron Cross armor transforming her into a cyborg. Iron Cross was later kidnapped by Kurt Dagmar due to her new nature alongside the other robots and AIs. Iron Cross managed to send a signal for help which was received by Winter Soldier. The control Dagmar had over Iron Cross was interrupted when he was killed by one of his Deathloks. She thanks Namor for absolving her father of any war crimes during the Nuremberg Trials.

She later battles Neo-Nazis in Germany and requests help from the All-New Invaders. They are interrupted by the Inhuman Lash, who is attempting to recruit Iron Cross, Toro, and the Neo-Nazis leader, who had no idea he was an Nuhuman. Medusa and the Inhuman Royal Court appear, so Lash leaves with the Neo-Nazi, who abandons the Nazi cause since he does not have pure Aryan blood. The Invaders later disband and Iron Cross returns to Germany to protect it from evil.

Powers and abilities
Helmut Gruler wears an advanced suit of armor that provides superhuman strength and durability, and flight via boot jets. The armor also has several offensive features, and is capable of releasing electric current, sleeping gas and an inky fluid similar to that discharged by an octopus. The suit provides some longevity by sustaining Gruler's body.

Clare Gruler's Iron Cross armor grants her flight and energy discharge. Her molecular bonding appears to have only worked once when her Inhuman gene activated.

In other media
The Helmut Gruler version of Iron Cross appears in the video game Captain America: Super Soldier, voiced by Michael Donovan. This version works for Hydra under the Red Skull and Arnim Zola. He is assigned to capture Captain America and obtain his blood so Hydra can recreate Abraham Erskine's super-soldier serum. However, Captain America defeats Iron Cross.

References

External links
 Iron Cross (Helmut Gruler) at Marvel Wiki
 Iron Cross (Clare Gruler) at Marvel Wiki
 Iron Cross (Helmut Gruler) at Comic Vine
 Iron Cross (Clare Gruler) at Comic Vine

Characters created by Roy Thomas
Comics characters introduced in 1979
Inhumans
Marvel Comics Nazis
Marvel Comics supervillains